Blizzard Mountain Ski Area is a modest ski area in the western United States, in central Idaho. The summit offers a sweeping view of the vast Snake River Plain to the east, south, and west.

There is one platter lift, and the area operates on Saturdays, conditions permitting.

References

External links
 YouTube.com − video − Blizzard Mountain − 2010-02-06
 YouTube.com − video − A day at Blizzard Mountain − 2010-02-13
 East Idaho Off Piste − Blizzard Mountain Ski Area & South Paw
 Colorado Ski History: Idaho Lost Ski Resorts Project − photo of Blizzard Mountain lift from base
 Ski Map.org – trail map – Blizzard Mountain
 Idaho Summits.com − Blizzard Mountain − 9313 ft.

Ski areas and resorts in Idaho
Tourist attractions in Butte County, Idaho